Sizzling Sixteen is a 2010 novel by Janet Evanovich, the sixteenth in the Stephanie Plum series.

Plot summary
Stephanie's boss, her cousin Vinnie, has been abducted by his bookie, who demands that Vinnie pay back his gambling losses (more than a million dollars) in five days, or he's dead.  Stephanie, Connie Rosoli and Lula must combine forces to rescue Vinnie and raise the money, especially after the bookie reveals that he and Vinnie are both in debt to someone much more powerful and much scarier.

External links
Profile on author's website

2010 novels
Stephanie Plum books